Krishna Sable (also spelled) Sabla was an Indian freedom fighter from Maharashtra.  He was born in a Koli family from Sabla villages in Maharashtra. Sable, along with Tantya Makaji, started a war of independence against the British. Krishna's son Maruti Sabale also played an important role in the Indian freedom movement.

Krishna Sable was a high-ranking officer in the Ahmednagar police force, but during the tribal revolt in Maharashtra, Sable also left the English police force and took up arms against British rule.

Freedom movement 
Vasudev Balwant Phadke had done the task of setting the rebellion on fire, and was sheltered by the Kolis in Pune for a few days. On the instigation of Phadke, in March 1879, Sable left the Ahmednagar police force and declared war against the British rule and his young son Maruti Sable also challenged the government with his father. Sable unified some revolutionary Kolis and attacked British-ruled Pune, attacked the government offices and government bases in Pune, which led to a large number of revolutionaries joining Sable. Sable and his comrades attacked the government office and treasury in Pune for seven consecutive months.

In July, Sable's rebellion appeared quite strong. He challenged the British subordinate bhor and government in Konkan. The British government sent British troops from Purandar and Saswad under the leadership of Major Wise to capture Sable but the army suffered failure after the encounter. During the monsoon, Sabale remained silent and in the meantime Tantya Makaji, who had been against the British rule for a long time, became one with Sable.

On 14 October 1879, a comrade of the Sable's of the Ramosi caste who belonged to the group of Tantya Makaji turned traitor, informing the British of all the activities of the revolutionaries, due to which Sable roasted in the accusations of the traitor. In December 1879, Major Wises attacked Sable's group, resulting in a number of companions being killed during the encounter, and Sabale was taken as a captive to Ahmednagar, where he was hanged.

References 

Koli people
Pune
Indian independence activists from Maharashtra
1879 deaths
1879 in India
 Political repression in British India
People from Ahmednagar